William W. Campbell may refer to:
 William Wallace Campbell (1862–1938), American astronomer
 William W. Campbell (New York congressman) (1806–1881), US congressman from New York
 William Wildman Campbell (1853–1927), Ohio politician
 William Wilfred Campbell (1858–1918), Canadian poet
 William W. Campbell (New York state senator) (1870–1934), American lawyer and politician from New York
  William W. Campbell (Schenectady County, NY), New York assemblyman 1921, in 144th New York State Legislature

See also
William Campbell (disambiguation)